Dalmore is a bounded rural locality in Victoria, Australia, 58 km south-east of Melbourne's Central Business District, located within the Shire of Cardinia local government area. Dalmore recorded a population of 142 at the 2021 census.

History
The Post Office opened on 17 March 1913 and closed in 1977. A Dalmore East office was open from 1920 until 1946.

Today
In conjunction with neighbouring township Tooradin, an Australian Rules football team (Tooradin-Dalmore) competes in the South East Football Netball League.

See also
 City of Cranbourne – Dalmore was previously within this former local government area.

References

Shire of Cardinia